Falcons 2000 Soccer Club is an Australian semi-professional soccer club based in the regional Victorian city of Morwell. Founded in 1961 by the local Italian community, the club has participated in the Victorian state league system at multiple levels, and in the defunct National Soccer League. After being re-established in 2000, the club currently participates in the Latrobe Valley Soccer League.

The club is one of the most successful in the Gippsland region, being the only club to have been crowned Victorian state premiers, on two occasions, and to have been the only rural club in Victoria to have participated at a national level. Since its inception, the club has played under multiple names, consisting of Gippsland Falcons SC, Eastern Pride, and being latterly known as the Morwell Falcons. The club bears its present name after its financial re-establishment in 2000.

History

The club was formed in 1961 by Italian migrants as the Italian Australian Social Club of Gippsland (IASCO), and initially played in the La Trobe soccer league.

In 1964, the club changed its name to Morwell Falcons as a result of a sponsorship arrangement with the Ford Motor Company. Morwell joined the wider ranks of the Victorian leagues in 1974, and quickly rose up the divisions reaching the Victorian State League in 1982, and winning the title in 1984. This allowed them to apply for the NSL's Southern Conference, but the club declined the offer. It was that same year that Jim McLean was the named as the Victorian Premier League Player of the Year (known as the Rothmans Medal at the time).

In 1989, Morwell won its second Victorian championship, but this time failed to progress to the top flight after losing 5–2 on aggregate in a two-legged tie against South Australian champion West Adelaide.

The club eventually joined the NSL's ranks in season 1992/93 as a replacement for Preston, but their stay was quite unsuccessful, making the finals only once in season 1994/95 after finishing fourth. The club thereafter always found itself near the bottom of the table, and late in season 2000/01 the club folded.

While the club officially disbanded in 2001, Falcons 2000 were created as an offshoot club, and currently compete in the Latrobe Valley Soccer League.

Honours

Victorian State First Tier
Premiers: 1984, 1989
Runner's Up: 1985
Victorian State First Tier Reserves
Premiers: 1991
Victorian State Third Tier
Runner's Up: 1980
Victorian State Fourth Tier
Runner's Up: 1979
Victorian State Fifth Tier
Runner's Up: 1977

Victorian State Sixth Tier
Premiers: 1974, 1975
Runner's Up: 1976
Victorian League Cup
Winners: 1984, 1989
Runner's Up: 1982 1985
Dockerty Cup
Winners: 1994

Notable former players

 Adam Griffiths
 Archie Thompson
 Billy Wright
 Brian Bothwell
 Ernie Tapai
 Eugene Galekovic
 Levent Osman
 Jeff Hopkins
 Alun Evans
 Aleksandar Đorđević
 Mark Foy
 Eddie Krncevic
 John Hutchinson (footballer)
 John Markovski
 Steve Mautone
 Mehmet Duraković
 Naum Sekulovski
 Sean Douglas
 Scott McDonald
 Scott Miller
 Warren Spink
 Eddie Krncevic
 Bobby Despotovski
 Marcus Stergiopoulos
 Dominic D’Agostino

References

Association football clubs established in 1961
National Soccer League (Australia) teams
1961 establishments in Australia
Italian-Australian backed sports clubs of Victoria
Morwell, Victoria